Fernanda da Silva Souza (born 15 November 1981) is a Brazilian former road bicycle racer. She competed at the 2012 Summer Olympics in the Women's road race, but finished over the time limit.

Major results

2008
 2nd Copa América de Ciclismo
2010
 National Road Championships
3rd Road race
3rd Time trial
2011
 1st Prova Ciclística 9 de Julho
2012
 4th Time trial, Pan American Road Championships
 5th Grand Prix GSB
2013
 10th Road race, Pan American Road Championships
2014
 1st  Time trial, South American Games
 2nd Overall Tour Femenino de San Luis
1st Stage 4 (ITT)
 9th Pan American Road Championships
2015
 5th Gran Prix San Luis Femenino

References

External links

Living people
Brazilian female cyclists
Brazilian road racing cyclists
Olympic cyclists of Brazil
Cyclists at the 2012 Summer Olympics
1981 births
South American Games gold medalists for Brazil
South American Games medalists in cycling
Competitors at the 2014 South American Games
Sportspeople from Ceará